Circle of Danger is a 1951 British thriller film directed by Jacques Tourneur which stars Ray Milland, Patricia Roc, Marius Goring, Hugh Sinclair and Naunton Wayne. An American travels to England to discover the truth behind his brother's death during the Second World War. The screenplay was by Philip MacDonald.

Cast
 Ray Milland as Clay Douglas 
 Patricia Roc as Elspeth Graham 
 Marius Goring as Sholto Lewis 
 Hugh Sinclair as Hamish McArran 
 Naunton Wayne as Reggie Sinclair 
 Edward Rigby as Idwal Llewellyn 
 Marjorie Fielding as Margaret McArran 
 John Bailey as Pape Llewellyn 
 Colin Gordon as Col. Fairbairn 
 Dora Bryan as Bubbles Fitzgerald 
 Reginald Beckwith as Oliver 
 David Hutcheson as Tony Wrexham 
 Michael Brennan as Bert Oakshott
 Peter Butterworth as Ernie (The Diver) (uncredited)

Critical reception
In The New York Times its anonymous reviewer wrote: "British restraint in acting and dialogue is almost painfully evident throughout the proceedings". Although Milland's acting is praised for its "naturalness, a quality which, it might be added, may be due in part to the unadorned and often expert dialogue turned out by Philip MacDonald", the film despite a decent British supporting cast, "is still an unexciting and largely placid adventure". Dennis Schwartz wrote of the film in 2013: "Though routine, the highly skilled Tourneur does his best to keep it lively, watchable and enjoyable."

References

External links
 

1951 films
1950s thriller films
1950s English-language films
Films directed by Jacques Tourneur
Films set in Scotland
Films set in Wales
Films set in London
British thriller films
British black-and-white films
1950s British films